Fontolizumab (planned trade name HuZAF) is a humanized monoclonal antibody and an immunosuppressive drug for the treatment of auto-immune diseases like Crohn's disease. A phase II clinical trial investigating the use for rheumatoid arthritis was terminated because the first phase did not meet the endpoint.

References 

Monoclonal antibodies
Abandoned drugs